Stephanie Inez Baldwin (born 1978) is a beauty queen from Fullerton, California.  She held the title of Miss California 2001 and placed in the top 20 at Miss America 2002. She earned over $25,000 in scholarships.

Biography
Baldwin graduated from Chapman University with a bachelor's degree in Liberal Studies and a Music Concentration in 2001.  She was a member of the Girl Scouts for 17 years and recently moved to New York City to pursue her acting career.

References

1978 births
Living people
Miss America 2002 delegates
People from Fullerton, California
Chapman University alumni